Saturday Morning Apocalypse is the second studio album by the metal/power metal band Powerglove, released on September 28, 2010, by E1 Music. It strays from Powerglove's usual brand of video game metal, and instead centers around TV, cartoon and movie themes that the band grew up with. This is the band's first release on E1 Music. A music video for "Batman" was released on July 28, 2011.

Track listing
All songs arranged and remixed by Powerglove.

A cover of "Under the Sea" from Disney's The Little Mermaid was planned to be included, but Disney denied the band rights to release the song. It was later included on 2018 album Continue? with Marc Hudson of DragonForce. Additionally, the band had wanted to release covers of the theme-songs to the following television series, but were not able to: Captain Planet and the Planeteers ThunderCats, and Tiny Toon Adventures

Personnel
 Chris Marchiel — guitar
 Nick Avila — bass guitar
 Bassil Silver — drums
 Alex Berkson — guitar
 Engineered, mixed and mastered by Bassil Silver
 Produced by Powerglove
 Synthesizers by Powerglove
 Tony Kakko — guest vocals and harmonies on "The Simpsons" and "Gotta Catch Em All"
 Front, back and inside cover art by Dave Rapoza, layout by Chris Marchiel

References

2010 albums
Powerglove (band) albums